3801 Thrasymedes  is a mid-sized Jupiter trojan from the Greek camp, approximately  in diameter. It was discovered on 6 November 1985, by astronomers with the Spacewatch survey at the Kitt Peak National Observatory in Arizona, United States. The dark Jovian asteroid has a rotation period of 20.3 hours and forms an asteroid pair with 1583 Antilochus. It was named after Thrasymedes from Greek mythology.

Orbit and classification 

Thrasymedes is a dark Jovian asteroid in a 1:1 orbital resonance with Jupiter. It is located in the leading Greek camp at the Gas Giant's  Lagrangian point, 60° ahead on its orbit . It is also a non-family asteroid of the Jovian background population. It orbits the Sun at a distance of 5.2–5.4 AU once every 12 years and 3 months (4,486 days; semi-major axis of 5.32 AU). Its orbit has an eccentricity of 0.02 and an inclination of 28° with respect to the ecliptic.

The body's observation arc begins with a precovery taken at Palomar Observatory in April 1954, more than 31 years prior to its official discovery observation at Kitt Peak.

Asteroid pair 

In 1993, Andrea Milani suggested that Thrasymedes forms an asteroid pair with 1583 Antilochus, using the hierarchical clustering method (HCM), which looks for groupings of neighboring asteroids based on the smallest distances between them in the proper orbital element space. 

The astronomer describes the finding as statistically significant though difficult to account for by a regular collisional event. The Antilochus–Thrasymedes pair is not listed at the Johnston's archive.

Physical characteristics 

Thrasymedes is an assumed, carbonaceous C-type asteroid, while the majority of larger Jupiter trojans are D-type asteroids.

Rotation period 

The first two fragmentary rotational lightcurves of Thrasymedes, taken before 2015, gave a rotation period of 9.60 and 16.02 hours, respectively.

In 2015, photometric observations by the Kepler space telescope gave two lightcurves. The best-rated one showed a period of  hours and a brightness variation of 0.14 magnitude. In June 2016, another period determination from 16 nights of observation by Robert Stephens at the Center for Solar System Studies in California gave a divergent  hours with a notably large amplitude of 1.07 magnitude.

Diameter and albedo 

According to the survey carried out by the NEOWISE mission of NASA's Wide-field Infrared Survey Explorer, Thrasymedes measures 34.28 kilometers in diameter and its surface has an albedo of 0.066, while he Collaborative Asteroid Lightcurve Link assumes a standard albedo for a carbonaceous asteroid of 0.057 and calculates a diameter of 35.12 kilometers based on an absolute magnitude of 11.0.

Naming 

This minor planet was named after the Greek warrior Thrasymedes, commander of 15 ships to Troy. He is the son of Nestor and brother of Antilochus, who was killed during a fight with Memnon. He was also one of the 30 warriors to enter the wooden Trojan Horse.

The official naming citation was published by the Minor Planet Center on 31 May 1988. The citation also mentions that this Jovian asteroids may have a common origin with 1583 Antilochus, because their orbits are very similar.

Notes

References

External links 
 Asteroid Lightcurve Database (LCDB), query form (info )
 Dictionary of Minor Planet Names, Google books
 Discovery Circumstances: Numbered Minor Planets (1)-(5000) – Minor Planet Center
 Asteroid 3801 Thrasymedes at the Small Bodies Data Ferret
 
 

003801
003801
Named minor planets
19851106